Boleo is a figure in Argentine tango

Boleo or Boléo may also refer to:

 El Boleo, a mine for copper and other minerals near Santa Rosalia, Mexico
 Compagnie du Boléo, a French company that developed the El Boleo mine
 Manuel de Paiva Boléo (1904-1992), a Portuguese professor of philology and linguistics.